Himalosphodrus is a genus of ground beetles in the family Carabidae. This genus has a single species, Himalosphodrus cnesipus. It is found in India.

References

Platyninae